Casting the Runes is a supernatural television drama produced by ITV in 1979. Running at 50 minutes, it was based on the ghost story Casting the Runes by British writer and academic M. R. James, first published in 1911 as the fourth story in More Ghost Stories, which was James' second collection of ghost stories. Directed by  Lawrence Gordon Clark for the series Playhouse, produced by Yorkshire Television, it was first broadcast on ITV on 24 April 1979. Adapted by Clive Exton, it reimagined the events of James's story taking place in a contemporary television studio.

Synopsis
The drama begins in 1968 with John Harrington (Christopher Good) walking his dog in the snow-covered landscape when the dog becomes agitated by the presence of something unseen that is silently hunting down Harrington, who has recently written a damming report on an American demonologist and cult figure named Karswell (Iain Cuthbertson), an Aleister Crowley-like figure and the self-styled 'Abbot of Lufford'. Harrington is savagely killed by a monstrous creature we only glimpse.

Prudence Dunning (Jan Francis) is the producer of an investigative television programme which is critical of Karswell, who in 1969 had written a book called A History of Witchcraft. Karswell's philosophy is that everyone should believe in "Vice as the only true virtue, lust as the only true modesty, indecency the only true decorum and evil the only true good." Mocking Karswell's teachings on-screen as "mumbo-jumbo", Dunning unknowingly encounters the vengeful Karswell in the local library where he knocks over her pile of books and slips a paper into them on which is runic writing before handing them back. Karswell places a doll of Dunning on a bed in a dollshouse beside a large model of a spider. That night she is attacked in her bed by a demonic spider. Derek Gayton (Bernard Gallagher), her boss at the tv studio, has met with Henry Harrington (Edward Petherbridge), and has learned how and why his brother John met his death. Dunning and the cast soon find themselves threatened by mysterious, malevolent forces and must save themselves - in any way they can.

Cast
Jan Francis .. Prudence Dunning
Bernard Gallagher .. Derek Gayton
Joanna Dunham .. Jean Gayton
Edward Petherbridge .. Henry Harrington
Iain Cuthbertson .. Julian Karswell 
Christopher Good .. John Harrington
Patricia Shakesby .. Elise Marriott
David Calder .. John Marriott
Jane Lowe .. Joanna 
Alan Downer .. Peter
Clifford Parrish .. Wiggin
Christine Buckley .. Housekeeper 
Abdul Ali .. Doctor 
Simon Prebble .. Newscaster

Adaptation
In 1979, the story was adapted as an episode of ITV Playhouse (Season 11, episode 9). In this 1979 version, the central protagonist is a woman, Prudence Dunning (played by Jan Francis). A review of the production in Horrified Magazine said:
"Exton and Clark work together to create a setting where the characters live in a definably real world that is being intruded by something ancient and unrelenting. There are some great performances, with Francis an anchor to everything as the unravelling Dunning. Cuthbertson has a grand time as the wicked Karswell, here a genuinely malevolent presence, a character who seems to revel in the power he wields. Filtering through a decade of that beguiling, bleak approach the play also has a suitably harsh conclusion as it fades out, the wreckage caused by Karswell extending far beyond the final shot of a devastated Dunning."

Robert Markworth, reviewing the piece for Spooky Isles in 2022, wrote:
"Casting the Runes may lack some of the polish of Clark's BBC films but, despite the slim budget afforded to this presentation, still carries enough of the director's familiar stamp of quality, and cleverly spooky flourishes, to ensure it fits comfortably within his supernatural oeuvre."

Location

The drama was shot exclusively in a snowy Leeds and the surrounding area. The exterior shots of Dunning arriving at the television studios were filmed at The Leeds Studios of ITV Yorkshire on Kirstall Road in Leeds. The former rectory/church hall (now private flats) on St. Mary's Street served as the former rectory in which Karswell was living. St Mary’s church in Mabgate seen in the drama was demolished in about 1980 after falling into disrepair. Other scenes were filmed in St. Mary’s Park while the shot of Karswell standing at the peak of a steep footbridge was filmed on St. Mary’s Street on the bridge crossing the New York Road. Karswell passes the curse to Dunning in the Brotherton Library at the University of Leeds.

References

External links

Adaptations of works by M. R. James
ITV television dramas
Television shows based on short fiction
A Ghost Story for Christmas
1979 horror films
1979 films
1979 television films
British supernatural television shows
1970s ghost films
Films with screenplays by Clive Exton
Films about curses
Films set in 1979
Films shot in Yorkshire
British ghost films
1970s British films